A kosovorotka, also known in the West as a Russian peasant shirt or Tolstoy shirt (tolstovka). The name comes from the Russian phrase kosoy vorot (косой ворот), meaning a “skewed collar”. It was worn by all peasants in Russia — men, women, and babies — in different styles for every-day and festive occasions.

Easy to make from one sheet of fabric, this garment is traditional for Russians, Mordovins, Setos, Komi-Permyaks and other ethnic groups in Russia, as well as in some regions of Moldova.

Description

A kosovorotka is a traditional Russian shirt, long sleeved and reaching down to the mid-thigh.  The shirt is not buttoned all the way down to the hem, but has several buttons at the collar (unfastened when the garment is pulled over the wearer's head), though these are positioned off to one side (regional styles vary between left and right), instead of centrally, as is customary with a typical Western 20th and 21st century man's shirt. The side slit was to prevent cross pendants that peasants wore under their shirts from falling out when they bent down during active physical labor. If left unbuttoned the collar appears skewed, which accounts for the garment's name. The collar and sleeves of kosovorotka were often decorated with a traditional embroidered ornament.

The overwhelming majority of Russians were peasants, who often worked bending down towards the ground. Almost all of them wore a Christian cross, which was considered strictly an underclothing sign. The skewed collar of the shirt was designed so to prevent the cross from falling out from under the shirt. This limited annoyance and allowed for the peasant to be more productive.

Generally associated with Russian peasants, the kosovorotka was worn by peasants and townsmen of various social categories  into the early 20th century, when it was rapidly displaced as an everyday garment by more efficient and less elaborate clothing after the Bolshevik Revolution of 1917.  The garment is also known as a tolstovka, or the Tolstoy-shirt, because the writer Leo Tolstoy customarily wore one in his later years.  Since the late 20th century kosovorotkas appear mostly as souvenirs and as scenic garments of Russian folk music, song and dance ensembles.

In popular culture
The kosovorotka is worn by Omar Sharif as Yuri Zhivago in David Lean's 1965 film Doctor Zhivago.

References

19th-century fashion
20th-century fashion
Russian culture
Russian inventions
Russian folk clothing
Shirts